Smart Design (or Smart) is a design consultancy based in New York City. Smart was founded in 1980 by industrial designers Davin Stowell, Tom Dair, Tucker Viemeister, and  Tamara Thomsen, with Stowell serving as CEO. The firm has been a prominent presence in the design industry since the late 1980s, as design competency increasingly came to be seen as "key to industrial competitiveness".

The company has had offices in San Francisco, Barcelona, and London at various points in its history in addition to its NYC headquarters, and has worked with clients including HP, Johnson & Johnson, Gillette, BBVA, PepsiCo's Gatorade, and Pyrex. In 2012, the company worked with the City's Taxi and Limousine Commission to redesign NYC's iconic taxis as part of a collaboration with Nissan titled the Taxi of Tomorrow, and also developed the now ubiquitous logo and decals found on the city's yellow taxis and green boro taxis.

The firm is best known for its design of the original Oxo Good Grips line in 1989, and longstanding relationship with Oxo, which continues to this day. The Good Grips potato peeler, the first in what would become a large range, was designed with OXO founder Sam Faber's wife Betsy in mind, who suffered from Arthritis. The Good Grips range of products is often cited as an archetypal example of an approach to industrial design involving user-centered prototyping and iteration, and where considerations of human factors and accessibility make a product better for all users. The Good Grips line is represented in the permanent collections of the Cooper Hewitt Smithsonian Design Museum and New York's Museum of Modern Art. 

In 2010, the company won the National Design Award for product design from the Smithsonian's Cooper Hewitt.

References 

Industrial design firms
Design companies of the United States
Companies based in New York City